Federico Comandini (11 August 1893 - 15 March 1967) was an Italian politician.

Comandini was born in Cesena. He was at first active in the Action Party, then in Popular Unity, then in the Italian Socialist Party, which he represented in the Chamber of Deputies from 1958 to 1963. 

Comandini was also a member of Giustizia e Libertà, an anti-fascist resistance group.

References

1893 births
1967 deaths
People from Cesena
Action Party (Italy) politicians
Popular Unity (Italy) politicians
Italian Socialist Party politicians
Members of the National Council (Italy)
Deputies of Legislature III of Italy
Politicians of Emilia-Romagna
Members of Giustizia e Libertà